Mitchell "Mitch" Budler (born January 3, 2003) is an American soccer player who plays as a goalkeeper for Akron Zips.

Career

Philadelphia Union II
In August 2019, Budler joined the Philadelphia Union academy. He made his competitive debut on 22 July 2020, playing for Philadelphia Union II in a 5–1 defeat to New York Red Bulls II.

References

External links
Mitchell Budler at US Soccer Development Academy

2003 births
Living people
Philadelphia Union II players
USL Championship players
American soccer players
Association football goalkeepers
Sportspeople from Lincoln, Nebraska
Akron Zips men's soccer players